Bishop Moore Vidyapith may refer to:

 Bishop Moore Vidyapith Mavelikkara, a Church of South India school in Mavelikkara, Kerala
 Bishop Moore Vidyapith, Kayamkulam, a Church of South India school in Kayamkulam, Kerala
 Bishop Moore Vidyapith Cherthala, a Church of South India school in Cherthala, Kerala

See also
Edward Moore (Bishop of Travancore and Cochin)